Alder Springs is an unincorporated community in Union County, Tennessee, in the United States.

The community was so named from the abundant hazel alder in a nearby swamp.

References

Unincorporated communities in Union County, Tennessee
Unincorporated communities in Tennessee